Mai Abdel-Jabbar Hamdan Selim (born November 6, 1983 in Abu Dhabi), commonly known as Mai Selim, is a Jordanian singer and actress. Her sisters are Mais Hamdan and Dana Hamdan.

Biography

Musical debut
Mai sings in the Egyptian dialect, though she was born to a Palestinian Jordanian father and a Palestinian mother. She has been living in Egypt ever since she was young and has stated she almost lived her whole life there. She gained a degree in Business Studies from Maritime Academy in Egypt.

Mai states that luck has played a big part in her being of where she is right now:

"I won't lie and give you the clichéd line of 'I've been working towards this all my life since I was a child' and all that stuff. I knew I had a very strong artistic side to me, and I had a strong passion towards music, but I never thought I'd make a career out of it one day."

In 2008, she released the album Ehlawet El Ayam.

Personal life
She married Egyptian businessman Ali al-Refai from November 2010 to 2012, with whom she had her daughter, Lili.

References

External links
 
 

1983 births
Living people
Jordanian film actresses
Jordanian stage actresses
Jordanian television actresses
Jordanian women singers
21st-century women singers
Singers who perform in Egyptian Arabic
Jordanian people of Lebanese descent
Jordanian people of Palestinian descent